In geometry, a quadratrix is a curve having ordinates which are a measure of the area (or quadrature) of another curve. The two most famous curves of this class are those of Dinostratus and E. W. Tschirnhaus, which are both related to the circle.

Quadratrix of Dinostratus

The quadratrix of Dinostratus (also called the quadratrix of Hippias) was well known to the ancient Greek geometers, and is mentioned by Proclus, who ascribes the invention of the curve to a contemporary of Socrates, probably Hippias of Elis. Dinostratus, a Greek geometer and disciple of Plato, discussed the curve, and showed how it effected a mechanical solution of squaring the circle. Pappus, in his Collections, treats its history, and gives two methods by which it can be generated. 
 Let a helix be drawn on a right circular cylinder; a screw surface is then obtained by drawing lines from every point of this spiral perpendicular to its axis. The orthogonal projection of a section of this surface by a plane containing one of the perpendiculars and inclined to the axis is the quadratrix. 
 A right cylinder having for its base an Archimedean spiral is intersected by a right circular cone which has the generating line of the cylinder passing through the initial point of the spiral for its axis. From every point of the curve of intersection, perpendiculars are drawn to the axis. Any plane section of the screw (plectoidal of Pappus) surface so obtained is the quadratrix.

Another construction is as follows.  is a quadrant in which the line  and the arc  are divided into the same number of equal parts. The locus of these intersections is the quadratrix. 

Letting  be the origin of the Cartesian coordinate system,  be the point ,  units from the origin along the -axis, and  be the point ,  units from the origin along the -axis, the curve itself can be expressed by the equation

These poles partition the curve into a central portion flanked by infinite branches. Since this is impossible with compass and straightedge, the quadratrix in turn cannot be constructed with compass and straightedge.
An accurate construction of the quadratrix would also allow the solution of two other classical problems known to be impossible with compass and straightedge: doubling the cube and trisecting an angle.

Quadratrix of Tschirnhaus

The quadratrix of Tschirnhaus is constructed by dividing the arc and radius of a quadrant in the same number of equal parts as before. The mutual intersections of the lines drawn from the points of division of the arc parallel to DA, and the lines drawn parallel to AB through the points of division of DA, are points on the quadratrix. Its properties are similar to those of the quadratrix of Dinostratus.

Other quadratrices 
Other curves that have historically been used to square the circle include:
Archimedean spiral
Ozanam's quadratrix
Cochleoid

References

External links

 Quadratrix of Hippias  at the MacTutor archive.
Hippias' Quadratrix at Convergence (MAA periodical)

Curves
Squaring the circle
Area